Kathputli was a Pakistani drama serial that aired on Hum TV on 11 June 2016 on Saturdays at 8:00 pm. After 5 episodes, it started airing on Sundays at 9:10 pm, giving way to Laaj on Saturdays. It is directed by Atif Rathore and produced by Fahim Burney. It is also produced Momina Duraid under her company MD Productions. It stars Gohar Mumtaz and his wife Anum Mumtaz as her debut in main roles. It ended on 23 October 2016, followed by Kitni Girhain Baqi Hain

It was dubbed in Pashto under the title گوڈاگئ and aired on Hum Pashto 1.

Cast
 Gohar Mumtaz as Sheraz 
 Anam Goher as Amna 
 Sanam Chaudhry as Mehrunnisa
 Shahbaz wolf rajput as Ali
 Farhan Ahmed Malhi as Ahad
 Samina Ahmad as Sheraz's mother 
 Maryam Tewana as Saira
 Farah Nadeem as Zeenat
 Shaheen Khan as Zaitoon Bano
 Khalid Butt as Ahsan & Ahad's father 
 Kulsoom Malik
 Benita David as Mehwish
 Anas Ali Imran as Zahir (Ahad's friend)
 Sameera Hassan
 Shazia Batool
 Fashee Sardar as Hassam

Plot
Kathputli is a story of dignity, love, relation and regret. The story revolves around Mehrunisa, a vivacious girl born into a male dominant household. Mehrunisa dreams of a successful professional life but is bounded by restrictions which keeps her away from pursuing her dreams.

Mehrunisa's friends take her to a farmhouse to celebrate their success in exams where she meets her inevitable fate by hands of a TV reporter. The incident dents her dignity and honour but her true suffering begins when her own family and fiancé accuse her of wrongdoings and banish her.

What was the incident that led to the destruction of such an innocent soul?

Will the reporter make up for his mistake and will she ever forgive him and her family for not believing in her innocence?

Production
In an interview, Anum said, "MD Production - Fahim Burney’s production house has been insisting that I act for them in the past year. But I had different priorities at the time. I was completing my studies and waiting for the right time to make my debut. Of course, working with Gohar felt like the most natural and comfortable way to begin".

Music
The title song of Kathputli is composed and sung by Rasmiya Baloch. It was released in June 2016.

See also
 2016 in Pakistani television
 List of programs broadcast by Hum TV

References

External links
 
 MD Productions

Hum TV
Hum Network Limited
Hum TV original programming
Pakistani telenovelas
Pakistani romantic drama television series
Serial drama television series
MD Productions
Television series by MD Productions
Television series created by Momina Duraid
Urdu-language television shows
2016 Pakistani television series debuts
Pakistani drama television series
2016 Pakistani television series endings